Germán Claudio Scarone (born February 27, 1975) is an Italian-Argentine professional basketball player.
He is a point guard, who is currently playing for Pallacanestro Monsummano of the Italian Serie B.

Scarone made his debut with the senior men's Italian national basketball team in 1998, and competed with Italy at the 2000 Summer Olympics.

Honors and awards

Treviso 
 Italian Cup (1): (1995)

Siena 
 FIBA Saporta Cup (1): (2002)

References

External links 
Euroleague.net Profile
Italian League Profile 
Italian Second Division Profile 

1975 births
Living people
Basketball players from Buenos Aires
Pallacanestro Treviso players
Mens Sana Basket players
Virtus Bologna players
Victoria Libertas Pallacanestro players
Viola Reggio Calabria players
Basket Rimini Crabs players
Olympic basketball players of Italy
Italian men's basketball players
Argentine people of Italian descent
Point guards